Richard Nichols may refer to: 

Dick Nichols (1926–2019), American banker and politician
Richard Nichols (solicitor) (1938–2016), English solicitor and Lord Mayor of London
Richard A. Nichols, British geneticist

See also
Richard Nichols House, historic building in Reading, Massachusetts
Richard Nicholls (1875–1948), English cricketer